Giulio Monti (1890 – 13 January 1960) was an Italian weightlifter. He competed in the men's lightweight event at the 1920 Summer Olympics.

References

External links
 

1890 births
1960 deaths
Italian male weightlifters
Olympic weightlifters of Italy
Weightlifters at the 1920 Summer Olympics
People from Marradi
Sportspeople from the Metropolitan City of Florence
20th-century Italian people